This article presents a list of the historical events and publications of Australian literature during 1939.

Events 
The Queenslander ceases publication after the last edition on February 22 1939. The magazine was first published on February 3 1866 by Thomas Blacket Stephens in Brisbane and published serialised novels, poems and short stories by many Australian writers.

Books 

 Erle Cox – Fool's Harvest
 Miles Franklin and Dymphna Cusack – Pioneers on Parade
 Arthur Gask – The Vengeance of Larose
 Michael Innes – Stop Press
 Will Lawson – In Ben Boyd's Day
 Jack Lindsay – Lost Birthright
 Myra Morris – Dark Tumult
 Henry Handel Richardson – The Young Cosima
 Alice Grant Rosman – William's Room
 Nevil Shute – What Happened to the Corbetts (aka Ordeal)
 Kylie Tennant – Foveaux
 E. V. Timms – Dark Interlude
 Arthur Upfield – The Mystery of Swordfish Reef
 Patrick White – Happy Valley

Short stories 

 Katharine Susannah Prichard
 "The Flight"
 "Painted Finches"
 Dal Stivens – "Solemn Mass"

Children's 

 Mary Grant Bruce – Son of Billabong
 Connie Christie – The Adventures of Pinkishell
 Dorothy Wall – The Complete Adventures of Blinky Bill

Poetry 

 Mary Gilmore – Battlefields
 A. D. Hope – "Australia"
 Hugh McCrae – Poems
 Furnley Maurice – "Whenever I Have..."
 Kenneth Slessor
 "Five Bells"
 Five Bells : XX Poems
 "South Country"
 Brian Vrepont – "The Miracle"

Drama 

 Sumner Locke Elliott
 The Cow Jumped Over the Moon
 Interval

Awards and honours

Literary

Poetry

Births 

A list, ordered by date of birth (and, if the date is either unspecified or repeated, ordered alphabetically by surname) of births in 1939 of Australian literary figures, authors of written works or literature-related individuals follows, including year of death.

 4 January – J. S. Harry, poet (died 2015)
 29 January – Germaine Greer, theorist, academic and journalist
 25 February – Gerald Murnane, novelist
 12 July – Phillip Adams, broadcaster and journalist
 22 August – Peter Steele, poet (died 2012)
 6 September – Barbara Hanrahan, writer (died 1991)
 7 October – Clive James, poet, novelist and critic (died 2019)
9 October – John Pilger, journalist, writer and documentary filmmaker
13 October – Suzanne Edgar, poet, short story writer and historian
14 December – John Baxter, novelist and biographer
 30 December – Glenda Adams, novelist (died 2007)

Deaths 

A list, ordered by date of death (and, if the date is either unspecified or repeated, ordered alphabetically by surname) of deaths in 1939 of Australian literary figures, authors of written works or literature-related individuals follows, including year of birth.

 3 May – Hilary Lofting, novelist, travel writer, journalist and editor (born 1881)
 19 December – Edward Sorenson, poet (born 1869)

See also 
 1939 in poetry
 List of years in literature
 List of years in Australian literature
 1939 in literature
 1938 in Australian literature
 1939 in Australia
 1940 in Australian literature

References

Literature
Australian literature by year
20th-century Australian literature